Border Crossing/Cruzando el Rio Bravo, or Border Crossing (Cruzando el Rio Bravo), is a sculpture by Luis Jiménez. It depicts a Mexican man carrying his wife and their baby on his shoulders as they cross the Rio Grande.

One fiberglass copy, completed in 1989, was purchased by the Museum of Contemporary Art San Diego and San Diego Museum of Art and installed in the May S. Marcy Sculpture Garden. Others are part of the collections of the Blanton Museum of Art (Austin, Texas), the Museum of Fine Arts, Houston, and the New Mexico Museum of Art (Santa Fe, New Mexico). Two others are installed at Iowa State University in Ames, Iowa and The University of Texas at San Antonio.

See also

 1989 in art

References

1989 sculptures
1989 establishments in California
Fiberglass sculptures in the United States
Iowa State University buildings and structures
Outdoor sculptures in Iowa
Outdoor sculptures in San Diego
Sculptures of the San Diego Museum of Art
Sculptures in New Mexico
Sculptures of children in the United States
Sculptures of men in the United States
Sculptures of women in the United States
Statues in Austin, Texas
Statues in Houston
Statues in Iowa
Statues in San Diego